Vinnie Curto (born July 10, 1955) is an American former professional boxer. Curto was managed by actor Sylvester Stallone and trained by Angelo Dundee.

Boxing career

IBF Super Middleweight Championship
Curto lost twice to IBF Champion Chong-Pal Park. The first bout was a decision in South Korea and then a stoppage loss.

WBF Super Cruiserweight Championship
On September 20, 1996, Curto won the World Boxing Federation Super Cruiserweight Title in Lincoln, Nebraska.

Acting career
Curto has made various film and television appearances.  He made his on-screen debut on November 9, 1984, when he appeared on the first season of Miami Vice in Episode 7 entitled "No Exit".  He played a bodyguard for Tony Amato, played by Bruce Willis.

Personal
Curto was born to a couple who allegedly were both homosexual; his father was also allegedly an alcoholic who abused Curto sexually.

Professional boxing record

| style="text-align:center;" colspan="8"|62 Wins (26 knockouts), 10 Losses (3 knockouts), 3 Draws, 1 No Contest
|-  style="text-align:center; background:#e3e3e3;"
|  style="border-style:none none solid solid; "|Res.
|  style="border-style:none none solid solid; "|Record
|  style="border-style:none none solid solid; "|Opponent
|  style="border-style:none none solid solid; "|Type
|  style="border-style:none none solid solid; "|Rd., Time
|  style="border-style:none none solid solid; "|Date
|  style="border-style:none none solid solid; "|Location
|  style="border-style:none none solid solid; "|Notes
|- align=center
|Win||62-10-3|| align=left| Jimmy Haynes
| ||  ||
|align=left| 
|align=left|Won WBF super cruiserweight title
|- align=center
|Win||61-10-3 || align=left| Lamont Ware
| ||  ||
|align=left| 
|align=left|
|- align=center
|Win||60-10-3 || align=left| Torman Doaks
| ||  ||
|align=left| 
|align=left|
|- align=center
|Loss||59-10-3 || align=left| Ernie Valentine
| ||  ||
|align=left| 
|align=left|
|- align=center
|Win||59-9-3 || align=left| Alphonso O'Hara
| ||  ||
|align=left| 
|align=left|
|- align=center
|Win||58-9-3 || align=left| Tyrone Bledsoe
| ||  ||
|align=left| 
|align=left|
|- align=center
|No Contest||57-9-3 || align=left| Ali Sanchez
| ||  ||
|align=left| 
|align=left|Double disqualification as Curto attacked Sanchez during a low blow timeout and uncontrolled melee followed.
|- align=center
|Loss||57-9-3 || align=left| Al Houck
| ||  ||
|align=left| 
|align=left| 
|- align=center
|Loss||57-8-3 || align=left| Glenn Kennedy
| ||  ||
|align=left| 
|align=left|For USA California State light heavyweight title
|- align=center
|Loss||57-7-3 || align=left| Chong-Pal Park
| ||  ||
|align=left| 
|align=left|For IBF super middleweight title
|- align=center
|Win||57-6-3 || align=left| Maurice Moore
| ||  ||
|align=left| 
|align=left| 
|- align=center
|Win||56-6-3 || align=left| Maurice Moore
| ||  ||
|align=left| 
|align=left| 
|- align=center
|Win||55-6-3 || align=left| Miguel Rosa
| ||  ||
|align=left| 
|align=left| 
|- align=center
|Loss||54-6-3 || align=left| Chong-Pal Park
| ||  ||
|align=left| 
|align=left|For IBF super middleweight title
|- align=center
|Win||54-5-3 || align=left| Mark Frazie
| ||  ||
|align=left| 
|align=left|Won WBC Continental Americas light heavyweight title
|- align=center
|Win||53-5-3 || align=left| Clinton Longmire
| ||  ||
|align=left| 
|align=left| 
|- align=center
|Win||52-5-3 || align=left| Zovek Barajas
| ||  ||
|align=left| 
|align=left| 
|- align=center
|Win||51-5-3 || align=left| Jeff McCall
| ||  ||
|align=left| 
|align=left| 
|- align=center
|Win||50-5-3 || align=left| Hector Negrete
| ||  ||
|align=left| 
|align=left| 
|- align=center
|Win||49-5-3 || align=left| Carlos Marks
| ||  ||
|align=left| 
|align=left| Marks was stopped on cuts.
|- align=center
|Win||48-5-3 || align=left| Pablo Rodriguez
| ||  ||
|align=left| 
|align=left| 
|- align=center
|Win||47-5-3 || align=left| Bob Patterson
| ||  ||
|align=left| 
|align=left| 
|- align=center
|Win||46-5-3 || align=left| Teddy Mann
| ||  ||
|align=left| 
|align=left| 
|- align=center
|Win||45-5-3 || align=left| Roger Phillips
| ||  ||
|align=left| 
|align=left| 
|- align=center
|Win||44-5-3 || align=left| Bennie Briscoe
| ||  ||
|align=left| 
|align=left| 
|- align=center
|Win||43-5-3 || align=left| Danny Heath
| ||  ||
|align=left| 
|align=left| 
|- align=center
|Win||42-5-3 || align=left| Donnie Bickford
| ||  ||
|align=left| 
|align=left| 
|- align=center
|Win||41-5-3 || align=left| Rick Zarbatany
| ||  ||
|align=left| 
|align=left| 
|- align=center
|Win||40-5-3 || align=left| Kelly Anderson
| ||  ||
|align=left| 
|align=left| 
|- align=center
|Win||39-5-3 || align=left| Eddie Melo
| ||  ||
|align=left| 
|align=left| 
|- align=center
|Win||38-5-3 || align=left| Marciano Bernardi
| ||  ||
|align=left| 
|align=left| 
|- align=center
|Win||37-5-3 || align=left| Dennis Waters
| ||  ||
|align=left| 
|align=left| 
|- align=center
|Win||36-5-3 || align=left| Jean-Yves Fillion
| ||  ||
|align=left| 
|align=left| 
|- align=center
|Win||35-5-3 || align=left| Bill Ramsey
| ||  ||
|align=left| 
|align=left| 
|- align=center
|Win||34-5-3 || align=left| Ralph Hollett
| ||  ||
|align=left| 
|align=left| 
|- align=center
|Win||33-5-3 || align=left| Bud Ramsey
| ||  ||
|align=left| 
|align=left| 
|- align=center
|Win||32-5-3 || align=left| Tony Daniels
| ||  ||
|align=left| 
|align=left| 
|- align=center
|Win||31-5-3 || align=left| Roscoe Bell
| ||  ||
|align=left| 
|align=left| 
|- align=center
|Win||30-5-3 || align=left| Tommy Ellis
| ||  ||
|align=left| 
|align=left| 
|- align=center
|Win||29-5-3 || align=left| Tony Daniels
| ||  ||
|align=left| 
|align=left|  
|- align=center
|Draw||28-5-3 || align=left| Willie Classen
| ||  ||
|align=left| 
|align=left|  
|- align=center
|Win||28-5-2 || align=left| Bob Payton
| ||  ||
|align=left| 
|align=left|  
|- align=center
|Win||27-5-2 || align=left| Joe Houston
| ||  ||
|align=left| 
|align=left|  
|- align=center
|Loss||26-5-2 || align=left| Tony Chiaverini
| ||  ||
|align=left| 
|align=left|  
|- align=center
|Win||26-4-2 || align=left| Nat King
| ||  ||
|align=left| 
|align=left|  
|- align=center
|Win||25-4-2 || align=left| Henry Walker
| ||  ||
|align=left| 
|align=left|  
|- align=center
|Win||24-4-2 || align=left| DC Walker
| ||  ||
|align=left| 
|align=left|  
|- align=center
|Win||23-4-2 || align=left| Dalton Swift
| ||  ||
|align=left| 
|align=left|  
|- align=center
|Win||22-4-2 || align=left| Steven Smith
| ||  ||
|align=left| 
|align=left|  
|- align=center
|Win||21-4-2 || align=left| Joe Grady
| ||  ||
|align=left| 
|align=left|  
|- align=center
|Loss||20-4-2 || align=left| Gene Wells
| ||  ||
|align=left| 
|align=left|  
|- align=center
|Win||20-3-2 || align=left| Nat King
| ||  ||
|align=left| 
|align=left|  
|- align=center
|Win||19-3-2 || align=left| Eddie Davis
| ||  ||
|align=left| 
|align=left|  
|- align=center
|Draw||18-3-2 || align=left| John Pinney
| ||  ||
|align=left| 
|align=left|  
|- align=center
|Loss||18-3-1 || align=left| Vito Antuofermo
| ||  ||
|align=left| 
|align=left|  
|- align=center
|Draw||18-2-1 || align=left| Bennie Briscoe
| ||  ||
|align=left| 
|align=left|  
|- align=center
|Loss||18-2 || align=left| Tony Licata
| ||  ||
|align=left| 
|align=left|For USBA middleweight title
|- align=center
|Win||18-1 || align=left| Chucho Garcia
| ||  ||
|align=left| 
|align=left|  
|- align=center
|Loss||17-1 || align=left| Rodrigo Valdéz
| ||  ||
|align=left| 
|align=left|  
|- align=center
|Win||17-0 || align=left| Luis Vinales
| ||  ||
|align=left| 
|align=left|  
|- align=center
|Win||16-0 || align=left| Baby Boy Rolle
| ||  ||
|align=left| 
|align=left|  
|- align=center
|Win||15-0 || align=left| Carlos Alberto Salinas
| ||  ||
|align=left| 
|align=left|
|- align=center
|Win||14-0 || align=left| Terry Daniels
| ||  ||
|align=left| 
|align=left|  
|- align=center
|Win||13-0 || align=left| Tommy Hicks
| ||  ||
|align=left| 
|align=left|  
|- align=center
|Win||12-0 || align=left| Nat King
| ||  ||
|align=left| 
|align=left|  
|- align=center
|Win||11-0 || align=left| Dennis Riggs
| ||  ||
|align=left| 
|align=left|  
|- align=center
|Win||10-0 || align=left| Casey Gacic
| ||  ||
|align=left| 
|align=left|
|- align=center
|Win||9-0 || align=left| Teddy Murray
| ||  ||
|align=left| 
|align=left|  
|- align=center
|Win||8-0 || align=left| Joe Hooks
| ||  ||
|align=left| 
|align=left|  
|- align=center
|Win||7-0 || align=left| Guillermo Escalera
| ||  ||
|align=left| 
|align=left|  
|- align=center
|Win||6-0 || align=left| Bernie Bennett
| ||  ||
|align=left| 
|align=left|  
|- align=center
|Win||5-0 || align=left| Calvin Hollaman
| ||  ||
|align=left| 
|align=left|  
|- align=center
|Win||4-0 || align=left| John Henry Jones
| ||  ||
|align=left| 
|align=left|  
|- align=center
|Win||3-0 || align=left| Jimmy Williams
| ||  ||
|align=left| 
|align=left|  
|- align=center
|Win||2-0 || align=left| David Lee Royster
| ||  ||
|align=left| 
|align=left|  
|- align=center
|Win||1-0 || align=left| Victor Taco Perez
| ||  ||
|align=left| 
|align=left|

Filmography
Film credits include:

References

External links

1955 births
Living people
People from East Boston, Boston
American people of Italian descent
Boxers from Boston
Light-middleweight boxers
American male film actors
American male television actors
American male boxers